God's thumb may refer to:

 Adansonia, a tree that is known in African folklore as "God's Thumb"
 A fictional rock formation that is part of the plot of the novel Holes, by Louis Sachar
 A fictional Pacific Ocean vantage point.